Inermoparmena besucheti is a species of beetle in the family Cerambycidae, and the only species in the genus Inermoparmena. It was described by Stephan von Breuning in 1971.

References

Parmenini
Beetles described in 1971